The 2008 Bahrain Speedcar Series round was the fourth round of the 2008 Speedcar Series. It was held on 5 and 6 April 2008 at Bahrain International Circuit in Sakhir, Bahrain. The race supported the 2008 Bahrain Grand Prix.

Classification

Qualifying

Race 1

Race 2

See also 
 2008 Bahrain Grand Prix
 2008 Bahrain GP2 Asia Series round

References

Speedcar Series
Speedcar